Myrmarachne elongata is a species  of jumping spider (family Salticidae) that mimics an ant.

Distribution
The World Spider Catalog gives the distribution of Myrmarachne elongata as from Africa to Japan. Wesolowska and Russell-Smith suggest that records outside Africa may be mis-identifications.

References

External links 
 ZipcodeZoo: Details of Myrmarachne elongata

Salticidae
Spiders of Africa
Spiders of Asia
Spiders described in 1915